Borðeyri is a small hamlet in north-west Iceland.

It is a minor commercial centre for nearby farms. The population on 15 July 2018 was 16

The hamlet is a part of the municipality Bæjarhreppur, which is one of the smallest in Iceland with a population of 100 in 2010. The municipality covers the west part of Hrútafjörður fjord. In Borðeyri, there is a pre-school and an elementary school, a garage and a guesthouse.

Prime Minister Sigurdur Eggerz and the painters Þorvaldur Skúlason and Karl Kvaran were born in Borðeyri.

References

External links
 Bordeyri

Populated places in Westfjords